Thomas Herzog (born 3 August 1941) is a German architect from Munich known for his focus on climate and energy use through the use of technologically advanced architectural skins. He began with an interest in pneumatics and became Germany's youngest architecture professor at the age of 32. He established his firm Herzog + Partner in 1983.

Biography

 1941 Born in Munich. High school diploma (Abitur)
 1960–1965 Studied architecture at Technische Universität München. Diploma
 1965–1969 Assistant at the office of Prof. Peter C. von Seidlein in Munich
 1969–1973 Scientific assistant at the University of Stuttgart
 1972 Doctorate inarchitecture, University of Rome "La Sapienza" | Dissertation 'Pneumatic Structures'
 1971 Founded own practice
 Since then has worked jointly with Verena Herzog-Loibl, Dipl.-Designer
 Development of building systems for theuse of renewable forms of energy
 Development of new building products
 Housing, administration, industrial and exhibition buildings, etc.
 1983–1989 Partnership with Michael Volz
 1994–2012 Partnership with Hanns Jörg Schrade
 1974–86 Professor of Architecture at the University of Kassel
 1986–93 – at Technical University Darmstadt 
 1993-06 – at Technische Universität München (TUM)
 2000–06 Dean of the Faculty of Architecture at TUM 
 since 2003 Guest professor
 at Tsinghua UniversityBeijing                                      
 at Ecole Polytechnique Féderal de Lausanne EPFL2003                          
 Graham Professor at the University of Pennsylvania (PENN)
 2004 at the Royal Danish Academy Copenhagen
 1982–98 Commencement of research and development work on renewable energies inbuilding for the European Commission in Brussels
 since 1998 R + D funding from Federal German Foundation of the Environment (DBU)
 1996 Chairman of the 4th European Conference on Solar Energy in Architecture and Urban Planning
 2000 German General Commissioner of the International Biennale of Architecture in Venice
 2000–2006 Expert "Deutsche Forschungsgemeinschaft" DfG
 2007 "Emeritus of Excellence", TUM
 2002–2008    Commissioner German Academy of Art, Villa Massimo, Rom

Notable projects
Source.
 1966–1968: Summerhouse at Chiemsee with R+R Then Bergh
 1977–1979: House Regensburg
 1981–1983: Housing Group Kranichstein, Darmstadt
 1986–1989: Two-family house, Pullach
 1987–1991: Guest building for the Youth Educational Centre, Windberg
 1989–1992: Production halls and central energy plant, Eimbeckhausen
 1988–1993: Design-Center, congress and exhibition centre, Linz, Austria
 1988–1993: Congress hotel, Linz, Austria
 1994–1996: Hall 26, Hanover Trade Fair (Deutsche Messe AG)
 1994–2003: Administration Centre, Wiesbaden
 1995–2004: Concept for SOLARCITY and social housing, Linz, Austria
 1999–2000: Large-scale roof structure with pavilions, Hanover (EXPODACH)
 2002–2006: Leibniz-Rechenzentrum, Garching bei München
 2005: Wohnquartier Shenyang, Volksrepublik China
 2004–2007: Atlantic-Haus, Hamburg, Germany
 2005–2007: Wohnungsbau in Aarhus, Dänemark
 2005–2008: Planung zusammen mit F. Tucci Solare Wohnbauten für die Stadt Rom Lunghezzina II
 2006: Kunstakademie Guangzhou, Volksrepublik China
 2006–2009: Oskar von Miller Forum, München

Awards
 1971: Rompreis, Deutsche Akademie Rom Villa Massimo
 1981: Mies-van-der-Rohe-Preis
 1993: Großer BDA-Preis, Goldmedaille
 1994: Balthasar-Neumann-Preis of the Bundes Deutscher Baumeister, Architekten und Ingenieure
 1994: Kulturpreis des Landes Oberösterreich for architecture, with Hanns Jörg Schrade and Heinz Stögmüller
 1996: Auguste-Perret-Preis of the Union Internationale des Architectes
 1996: Architekturpreis der Landeshauptstadt München
 1998: Den grønne Nål of Dänischen Architektenbundes (Akademisk Arkitektforening), Kopenhagen
 1998: Leo-von-Klenze-Medaille
 1998: Grande médaille d'or du Prix de l'Académie d'Architecture de France, Paris
 1999: Fritz-Schumacher-Preis für Architektur
 2000: Europäischer Preis für Solares Bauen
 2005: Heinz-Maier-Leibnitz-Medaille of the TU München
 2006: European award for architecture and technology
 2007: International Architecture Award, Chicago Athenaeum
 2007: Honorary doctorate of the University of Ferrara, Italy
 2009: Global Award for Sustainable Architecture
 2016: Bayerischer Verdienstorden

Memberships
 Académie d'Architecture, Paris
 Akademie der Künste, Berlin
 Bayerische Akademie der Schönen Künste, München
 Petrov Academy of Fine Arts and Sciences, Sankt Petersburg, Russland
 International Academy of Architecture, UNESCO, Sofia, Bulgarien
 Fraunhofer Gesellschaft
 PLEA
 EUROSOLAR
 Bund Deutscher Architekten BDA
 Deutscher Werkbund

References

Further reading

External links
 Homepage
 Technische Universität München

20th-century German architects
Technical University of Munich alumni
Academic staff of the Technical University of Munich
Members of the Academy of Arts, Berlin
1941 births
Living people
Architects from Munich
Academic staff of Technische Universität Darmstadt